Tunisians ( Tūnisiyyūn,  Twensa) are the citizens and nationals of Tunisia in North Africa, who speak Tunisian Arabic and share a common Tunisian culture and identity. In addition, a Tunisian diaspora has been established with modern migration, particularly in Western Europe, namely France, Italy and Germany.

Today, the cultural and national identity of Tunisians is the product of a centuries-long historical trajectory, with the Tunisian nation today being a junction of Arab, Amazigh and Punic substratum, as well as Levantine, Roman, Sicilian, Andalusian, Vandal, Byzantine, Norman, Spanish, Turkish, and French cultural and linguistic input.

History 

Numerous civilizations and peoples have invaded, migrated to, or have been assimilated into the population over the millennia, with influences of population from Berbers, Phoenicians, Punic, Romans, Vandals, Greeks, Arabs, Normans, Italians, Spaniards, Ottoman Turks/Janissaries and French.

Africa and Ifriqiya 

The first people known to history in what is now Tunisia were Berber people of the Capsian culture related to the Numidians. Phoenicians settled Tunisia during the 12th to the 2nd century BC, founded ancient Carthage. The migrants brought with them their culture and language that progressively spread from Tunisia's coastal areas to the rest of the coastal areas of Northwest Africa, the Iberian Peninsula and the Mediterranean islands. From the eighth century BC, most of Tunisians were Punics. When Carthage fell in 146 BC to the Romans the coastal population was mainly Punic, but that influence decreased away from the coast. From the Roman period until the Islamic conquest, Latins, Greeks and Numidian people further influenced the Tunisians, which prior to the modern era, Tunisians were known as Afāriqah, from the ancient name of Tunisia, Ifriqiya or Africa in the antiquity, which gave the present-day name of the continent Africa.

From the Muslim conquest of the Maghreb in 673, many Arabs settled with Arab tribes in Tunisia which was called Ifriqiya, in places like Kairouan which soon became one of the purely Arab settlements in the Umayyad Caliphate. This accelerated in the 11th century with the large migrations of the Arab tribes of Banu Hilal and Banu Sulaym to Ifriqiya and the rest of the Maghreb. Some Persians and other Middle-Eastern populations also settled in Ifriqiya, which had its name from the ancient name, the Roman province of Africa.  In the early-11th century, Normans from the Kingdom of Sicily took over Ifriqiya and founded the Kingdom of Africa, which lasted from 1135 to 1160. Muslim refugees from Sicily and Malta were encouraged by the Normans to settle in Tunisia during this period.

After the Reconquista and expulsion of non-Christians and Moriscos from Spain, many Spanish Muslims and Jews also arrived. According to Matthew Carr, "As many as eighty thousand Moriscos settled in Tunisia, most of them in and around the capital, Tunis, which still contains a quarter known as Zuqaq al-Andalus, or Andalusia Alley."

Tunisians 

During the 17th to the 19th centuries, Ifriqiya came under Spanish, then Ottoman rule and hosted Morisco then Italian immigrants from 1609. Tunis was officially integrated into the Ottoman Empire as the Eyalet of Tunis (province), eventually including all of the Maghreb except Morocco.

Under the Ottoman Empire, the boundaries of the territory inhabited by Tunisians contracted; Ifriqiya lost territory to the west (Constantine) and to the east (Tripoli). In the 19th century, the rulers of Tunisia became aware of the ongoing efforts at political and social reform in the Ottoman capital. The Bey of Tunis then, by his own lights but informed by the Turkish example, attempted to effect a modernizing reform of institutions and the economy. Tunisian international debt grew unmanageable. This was the reason or pretext for French forces to establish a Protectorate in 1881.

A remnant of the centuries of Turkish rule is the presence of a population of Turkish origin, historically the male descendants were referred to as the Kouloughlis.

French protectorate

Republic and Revolution 

Independence from France was achieved on March 20, 1956. The State was established as a constitutional monarchy with the Bey of Tunis, Muhammad VIII al-Amin Bey, as the king of Tunisia. In 1957, the Prime Minister Habib Bourguiba abolished the monarchy and firmly established his Neo Destour (New Constitution) party. In the 1970s the economy of Tunisia expanded at a very healthy rate. Oil was discovered and tourism continued. City and countryside populations drew roughly equal in number. Yet agricultural problems and urban unemployment led to increased migration to Europe.

The 84-year-old President Bourguiba was overthrown and replaced by Ben Ali his Prime Minister on November 7, 1987. However, the Ben Ali regime came to an end 23 years later on January 14, 2011, in the events of the Tunisian Revolution, following nationwide demonstrations precipitated by high unemployment, food inflation, corruption, a lack of political freedoms like freedom of speech and poor living conditions.

Following the overthrow of Ben Ali, Tunisians elected a Constituent Assembly to draft a new constitution and an interim government known as the Troika because it was a coalition of three parties; the Islamist Ennahda Movement in the lead, with the centre-left Congress for the Republic and the left-leaning Ettakatol as minority partners. Widespread discontent remained however, leading to the 2013–14 Tunisian political crisis. As a result of the efforts made by the Tunisian National Dialogue Quartet, the Constituent Assembly completed its work, the interim government resigned, and new elections were held in 2014, completing the transition to a democratic state. The Tunisian National Dialogue Quartet was awarded the 2015 Nobel Peace Prize for "its decisive contribution to the building of a pluralistic democracy in Tunisia in the wake of the Tunisian Revolution of 2011".

Beyond the political changes, which lead to Tunisia becoming a recognised democracy in 2014, those events also brought important changes to the post-2011 Tunisian culture.

Population

Ethnic groups 
The country's population is predominantly composed of Arabs (98%, includes Arab-Berbers). Other ethnic groups include 1% European who settled in the country and 1% of other ethnic groups, including mainly Berbers and sub-Saharan migrants. While Ottoman influence was particularly important in the formation of a Turkish-Tunisian community among the country's elites, other peoples also migrated to Tunisia over different periods of time, including but not limited to, sub-Saharans, Greeks, Romans, Phoenicians (Punics), Jews and French settlers. Nevertheless, from 1870, the distinction between the Tunisian masses and the Turkish elite became blurred. There is also a minority Berber population (1%) mainly located in the Dahar mountains.

From the late 19th century to after World War II, Tunisia was home to large populations of French and Italians (255,000 Europeans in 1956), although nearly all of them, along with the Jewish population, left after Tunisia became independent. The history of the Jews in Tunisia goes back some 2,600 years. In 1948 the Jewish population was an estimated 105,000, but by 2013 only about 900 remained.

Genetic

Genetically, most Tunisians are of Berber or Arab descent. The overwhelming majority of the population has at least some Arabian ancestry. Tunisians mainly carry E1b1 haplogroup (55%) and J1 haplogroup (34.2%). 

"In fact, the Tunisian genetic distances to European samples are smaller than those to other North African groups. (...) This could be explained by the history of the Tunisian population, reflecting the influence of the ancient Phoenician settlers of Carthage followed, among others, by Roman, Byzantine, Arab and French occupations, according to historical records. Notwithstanding, other explanations cannot be discarded, such as the relative heterogeneity within current Tunisian populations, and/or the limited sub-Saharan genetic influence in this region as compared with certain other North African areas, without excluding the possibility of the genetic drift, whose effect might be particularly amplified on the X chromosome.".

Y-Chromosome
Listed here are the human Y-chromosome DNA haplogroups in Tunisia.

Elkamel, Sarra et al. (2021) wrote that: "Considering Tunisian populations as a whole, the majority part of their paternal haplogroups are of autochthonous Berber origin (71.67%), which co-exists with others assumedly from the Middle East (18.35%) and to a lesser extent from Sub-Saharan Africa (5.2%), Europe (3.45%) and Asia (1.33%)."

Tunisian culture

Tunisian culture is a product of more than three thousand years of history and an important multi-ethnic influx. Ancient Tunisia was a major civilization crossing through history; different cultures, civilizations and multiple successive dynasties contributed to the culture of the country over centuries with a varying degrees of influence. Among these cultures were the Carthaginian – their native civilization, Roman (Roman Africans), Vandal, Jewish, Christian, Arab, Islamic, Turkish, and French, in addition to native Amazigh. This unique mixture of cultures made Tunisia, with its strategic geographical location in the Mediterranean, the core of some great civilizations of Mare Nostrum.

The important elements of Tunisian culture are diverse and represent a unique, mixed heritage. This heritage can be experienced first-hand in: museums such as the Bardo Museum, the contrast and diversity of city architecture such as Sidi Bou Said or the medina of Tunis, cuisine such as cheeses and French croissants, music reflecting Andalusian and Ottoman influences, literature, cinema, religion, the arts, and sports and other areas of Tunisian culture.

Cultural diversity
In his thesis study on Tunisian Cultural Policy, Rafik Said has mused that, "this relatively small area has produced estates, overlapping of cultures, and a confrontation of morals and doctrines throughout its history. Janice Rhodes Deledalle has referred to Tunisian culture as "cosmopolitan" and has said that "Tunisia cannot be considered in the category of as other colonies", because of the diversity of cultures embedded in Tunisia's heritage throughout the ages.

Cultural symbols
National identity is strong, and efforts to establish a national culture in Tunisia have been more successful than they were in the nineteenth century. The country's modern history, in particular the creation of the modern state that followed the French protectorate from the 1950s, is frequently discussed in relation to national culture and heritage. This is celebrated through national holidays, in the names of streets recalling historical figures or key dates or the subject of films or documentaries.

Flag

The national flag of Tunisia is predominantly red and consists of a white circle in the middle containing a red crescent around a five-pointed star. The Hafsid dynasty used a similar flag during the Middle Ages, it consisted of a white crescent pointing upwards and a white five-pointed star but instead of featuring the red color it featured the yellow color. The crescent and star might also recall the Ottoman flag as an indication of Tunisia's history as a part of the Ottoman Empire.
Whitney Smith states that the crescent was first emblazoned on standards and buildings in the Punic state of Carthage, located in present-day Tunisia. Since appearing on the Ottoman flag, they were widely adopted by Muslim countries. The sun is often represented with the crescent on ancient Punic artifacts and is associated with the ancient Punic religion, especially with the Sign of Tanit.

Coat of arms

As for the national coat of arms, they are officially adopted in 1861 and include revised versions on June 21, 1956, and May 30, 1963. The top has a Carthaginian galley sailing on the sea while the lower part is divided vertically and on the right depicts a black lion seizing a silver scimitar. A banner bears the national motto: "Liberty, Order, Justice".

Jasmine

Imported by the Andalusians in the sixteenth century, jasmine has become the national flower of Tunisia. The gathering takes place at dawn and then, upon nightfall, when young boys collect small bouquets, and later sell them to passersby on the street or to motorists stopped at intersections.

Furthermore, jasmine is the subject of a specific sign language. A man who wears jasmine on his left ear indicates that he is single and in addition, offering white jasmine is seen as a proof of love while on the contrary, offering odorless winter jasmine is a sign of insolence.

Hamsa

The hamsa (also romanized khamsa) is a palm-shaped amulet popular in Tunisia and more generally in the Maghreb, and commonly used in jewelry and wall hangings. Depicting the open right hand, an image recognized and used as a sign of protection in many times throughout history, the hamsa is believed to provide defense against the evil eye. It has been theorized that its origins lie in Carthage (modern-day Tunisia) and may have been associated with the Goddess Tanit.

Sign of Tanit

The sign of Tanit is an anthropomorph symbol present on many archaeological remains of the Punic Civilization. Both the symbol and the name of the goddess Tanit, are still frequently used within Tunisian culture such as with the tradition of Omek Tannou or the grand film prize of the Tanit d'or. Some scholars also relate the name of the capital Tunis and by extension the one of the modern country and its people to the Phoenician goddess Tanith ('Tanit or Tanut), as many ancient cities were named after patron deities.

Chechia

The Chechia is the national headgear of Tunisia. Supple and cylindrical in shape, the chechia was imported into Tunisia in its current form from Spain, by the Moors expelled after the capture of Granada in 1492. Finding in Tunisia a second homeland, they establish the craft of the chechia there. After the independence of Tunisia in 1956 and with the arrival of manufactured goods and customs from the Europe, the wearing of the chechia tends to be limited to holidays and religious festivals; it is often associated with the elderly.

Language

Tunisian people are homogeneous in terms of language, since nearly all of them speak Tunisian Arabic as their mother-tongue in addition to mastering French and/or Modern Standard Arabic. The Tunisian dialect is built upon a significant Berber, Latin (African Romance) and Neo-Punic<ref name="maghribi">{{Cite journal|title =' 'Le maghribi, langue trois fois millénaire|url = http://insaniyat.revues.org/12102|publisher =  ELIMAM, Abdou (Éd. ANEP, Algiers 1997), Insaniyat|date=1998|pages=129–130|first = Abdou|last = Elimam|journal = Insaniyat / إنسانيات. Revue Algérienne d'Anthropologie et de Sciences Sociales|issue = 6}}</ref> substratum, while its vocabulary is mostly derived from a morphological corruption of Arabic, French, Turkish, Italian and the languages of Spain. Multilingualism within Tunisia and in the Tunisian diaspora makes it common for Tunisians to code-switch, mixing Tunisian with French, English or other languages in daily speech.

Moreover, Tunisian is closely related to the Maltese language, that descended from Tunisian and Siculo-Arabic.

 Gastronomy 

Tunisian cuisine is a blend of Mediterranean cuisine and traditions. Its distinctive spicy fieriness comes from neighbouring Mediterranean countries and the many civilizations who have ruled Tunisian land: Romans, Vandals, Byzantines, Arabs, Spanish, Turkish, Italians (Sicilians), French, and the native Punics-Berber people. Tunisian food uses a variety of ingredients and in different ways. The main dish that is served in Tunisia is Couscous, made of minuscule grains that are cooked and usually served with meat and vegetables. In cooking they also use a variety of flavors such as: olive oil, aniseed, coriander, cumin, caraway, cinnamon, saffron, mint, orange, blossom, and rose water.

Like all Mediterranean cultures, Tunisian culture offers a "sun cuisine", based mainly on olive oil, spices, tomatoes, seafood (a wide range of fish) and meat from rearing (lamb).

Architecture

Tunisian architecture is traditionally expressed in various facets in Tunisia through Roman architecture and Islamic architecture. Through many buildings, Kairouan forms the epicenter of an architectural movement expressing the relationship between buildings and spirituality with the ornamental decoration of religious buildings in the holy city. In Djerba, the architecture such as the fortress of Kef reflects the military and spiritual destiny of a Sufi influence in the region.

The influential role of the various dynasties that ruled the country, particularly in building cities and princes of Raqqada Mahdia, illuminates the role of the geopolitical context in the architectural history of the country. Thus, many original fortresses that protected the coast from Byzantine invasions evolved into cities, like Monastir, Sousse or Lamta.

The medina of Tunis, is World Heritage Site of UNESCO, and is a typical example of Islamic architecture. However, in the areas between the ports of Bizerte and Ghar El Melh, settlements founded by the Moors fleeing Andalusia were reconquered by Catholic sovereigns and has more of a Christian influence.
Given the cosmopolitan nature of cities in Tunisia, they have retained a diversity and juxtaposition of styles. Many buildings were designed by many different architects, artisans and entrepreneurs during the French protectorate. Among the most famous architects of that time were Victor Valensi, Guy Raphael, Henri Saladin, Joss Ellenon and Jean-Emile Resplandy. Five distinct architectural and decorative styles are particularly popular: those of the eclectic style (neo-classical, baroque, etc..) Between 1881 and 1900 and then again until 1920 the style was neo-Mauresque, between 1925 and 1940 it was in the Art Deco style and then the modernist style between 1943 and 1947.

Music

According to Mohammed Abdel Wahab, Tunisian music has been influenced by old Andalusian songs injected with Turkish, Persian and Greek influences. Of major note in Tunisian classical music is the Malouf. Deriving from the reign of the Aghlabids in the 15th century, it is a particular type of Andalusian music. In urban areas it uses stringed instruments (fiddle, oud and Kanun) and percussion (darbuka) while in rural areas, it may also be accompanied by instruments like the mezoued, gasba and the zurna.

The emergence of new patterns of racial and improvised music since the late 1990s changed the musical landscape of Tunisia. At the same time, the majority of the population is attracted by the music of Levantine origin (Egyptian, Lebanese or Syrian). Popular western music has also had major success with the emergence of many groups and festivals, including rock music, hip hop, reggae and jazz.

Among the major Tunisian contemporary artists include Hedi Habbouba, Saber Rebaï, Dhafer Youssef, Belgacem Bouguenna, Sonia M'barek and Latifa. Other notable musicians include Salah El Mahdi, Anouar Brahem, Zied Gharsa and Lotfi Bouchnak.

Cinema

Tunisian cinema is today recognized as one of the most liberal, most inventive (and one of the most prize-winning) cinemas of Africa and the Middle-east. Since the 90s, Tunisia became an attractive place for filming and numerous companies emerged, serving the foreign film industry and became successful. Tunisia also hosts the Carthage Film Festival which has been taking place since 1966. The festival gives priority to films from African and Middle-eastern countries. It is the oldest film festival on the African continent.

Theatre
In over a century of existence, Tunisian theatre hosted or gave birth to big names, such as Sarah Bernhardt, Pauline Carton, Gérard Philipe and Jean Marais to mention a few. On November 7, 1962, Habib Bourguiba, whose brother is a playwright, devoted his speech to this art, which he considers "a powerful means of disseminating culture and a most effective means of popular education". From this date, November 7 is regarded as the Tunisian National Day of drama.

Dance

The variety of dances performed by the Tunisians probably reflects the migration flows that have traversed the country throughout the centuries. Thus, the early Phoenicians brought with them their songs and dances, whose traces are rooted in the region of Tunis, while the Romans have left few traces of art in relation to their architectural contribution. Religious dances were influenced by Sufism but by the end of the 15th century, had progressively become Andalusian with their dances and urban music.

Oriental dance would arrive later with the Ottomans, although some experts in the history of Northwest African art have said it was brought to Tunisia by the first Turkish corsairs in the sixteenth century while others say that the origin of this dance goes back further to the era of matriarchy in Mesopotamia and founded by the early Phoenicians. This form of oriental dance usually performed in Tunisia insists on the movements of the pelvis in rhythm, movement highlighted by the elevation of the arms to horizontal, and feet moving in rhythm and transferring weight onto the right leg or left.

The Nuba, more rooted in popular practice, is linked to the dancers and the Kerkennah Djerba to a lesser extent. Some experts say that their dress is of Greek origin. Structured into several scenes, the dance is often accompanied by acrobatic games with jars filled with water.

Literature

Among the Tunisian literary figures include Ali Douagi, who has produced more than 150 radio stories, over 500 poems and folk songs and nearly 15 plays, Khraief Bashir and others such as Moncef Ghachem, Mohamed Salah Ben Mrad or Mahmoud Messadi. As for poetry, Tunisian poetry typically opts for nonconformity and innovation with poets such as Aboul-Qacem Echebbi. As for literature, it is characterized by its critical approach. Contrary to the pessimism of Albert Memmi, who predicted that Tunisian literature was sentenced to die young, a high number of Tunisian writers are abroad including Abdelwahab Meddeb, Bakri Tahar, Mustapha Tlili, Hélé Béji or Mellah Fawzi. The themes of wandering, exile and heartbreak are the focus of their creative writing.

The national bibliography lists 1249 non-school books published in 2002 in Tunisia. In 2006 this figure had increased to 1,500 and 1,700 in 2007. Nearly a third of the books are published for children.

Tunisian Diaspora

Statistics of the Office of Tunisians Abroad show more than 128,000 Tunisian families in Europe with a concentration in France and Germany. Young Tunisians (less than 16 years of age) represent 25% of the Tunisian community abroad. Thus there is currently a rejuvenation of the Tunisian diaspora which is now in its third generation. Women represent nearly 26% of the total community. In France, their percentage is estimated at 38.2%. The portion of the diaspora who are over 60 years old is around 7%.

Originally, the largest part of the Tunisians in Europe worked in sectors requiring minimal qualifications. In effect the migrants of the 1960s and 70s were less educated (mostly farmers or manual labourers).

Subsequently, the majority of Tunisians settled in France have worked in the service sector (hotels, restaurants or retail) or have headed small businesses. In 2008, Tunisia became the first of the Maghreb countries to sign a management agreement concerning the flow of migrants, at the impetus of President Nicolas Sarkozy: it provides easy access for almost 9,000 Tunisian students enrolled in French institutions,  but also almost 500 titres de séjour'' (residency permits) for highly qualified individuals so that they can acquire experience in France, valid for a maximum of six years.

Notable People of Tunisian Heritage

Prominent Historical Figures

Aboul-Qacem Echebbi, Abu Zakariya Yahya, Ahmad I ibn Mustafa, Aisha Al-Manoubya, Ali Douagi, Ali ibn Ziyad, Asad ibn al-Furat, Augustine of Hippo, Aziza Othmana, Azzedine Alaïa, Bchira Ben Mrad, Beji Caid Essebsi, Carlos Marcello, Cato the Younger, Charles Nicolle, Chokri Belaid, Cyprian, Dido of Carthage, Farhat Hached, Gaiseric, Habib Bourguiba, Hannibal, Hanno the Navigator, Hasdrubal Barca, Hassan ibn al-Nu'man, Hayreddin Pasha, Ibn Abi Zayd, Ibn al-Jazzar, Ibn Khaldun, Ibn Rachik, Ibrahim II of Ifriqiya, Lamine Bey, Mago (agricultural writer), Mago Barca, Max Azria, Mohamed Bouazizi, Mohamed Brahmi, Moncef Bey, Moufida Bourguiba, Muhammad al-Tahir ibn Ashur, Olivia of Palermo, Paul Sebag, Pope Victor I, Radhia Haddad, Rodolphe d'Erlanger, Roger II of Sicily, Sahnun, Saint Perpetua, Sophonisba, Terence, Tertullian, Tunisian National Dialogue Quartet (Entity winner of the 2015 nobel peace prize) and Victor Perez

Modern International Figures
Salah Mejri (United States), Bertrand Delanoë (France), Claude Bartolone (France), Dove Attia (France), M. Salah Baouendi (United States), Poorna Jagannathan (United States), Mustapha Tlili (United States), Ferrid Kheder (United States), Oussama Mellouli (United States), Leila Ben Youssef (United States), Mounir Laroussi (United States), Bushido (rapper) (Germany),
Loco Dice (Germany), Sami Allagui (Germany), Claudia Cardinale (Italy), Änis Ben-Hatira (Germany), Mounir Chaftar (Germany),
Sofian Chahed (Germany), Nejmeddin Daghfous (Germany), Marwan Kenzari (Netherlands), Rani Khedira (Germany), Sami Khedira (Germany), Ayman (Germany),
Elyas M'Barek (Germany), Adel Tawil (Germany), Amel Karboul (Germany), Michel Boujenah (France), Tarak Ben Ammar (France), Lââm (France), Nolwenn Leroy (France), Yoann Touzghar (France), Isleym (France), 
Hatem Ben Arfa (France), Sadek (France), Tunisiano (France), Afef Jnifen (Italy), Sana Hassainia (Canada), Hinda Hicks (England), Mohamed Hechmi Hamdi (England), Hend Sabry (Egypt), Ghassan bin Jiddo (Lebanon), Cyril Hanouna (France), Kev Adams (France) and Sabrine Bentunsi (France).

Links with Tunisia 
In Tunisia, free courses of instruction in Tunisian Arabic are organised during the summer holidays for the children of Tunisian residents abroad, who are heavily influenced by the culture of the countries in which they live. Trips are also organised for them to experience Tunisian culture, history and civilisation.

See also
Moroccans

References 

Tunisian diaspora
 
Tunisian people by ethnic or national origin
Society of Tunisia
Arabs in Tunisia
Arabs
North African people
Tunisia
Maghreb
North Africa